Vadonaxia peyrierasi is a species of beetle in the family Buprestidae, the only species in the genus Vadonaxia.

References

Buprestidae

Beetles described in 1969